This article collates key records and statistics relating to Leicester City F.C., including information on honours, player appearances and goals, matches, sequences, internationals, season records, opponents and attendances.

Honours 
 First Division/Premier League:
 Champions: 2015–16
 Runners-up: 1928–29
 Second Division/Championship:
 Champions: 1924–25, 1936–37, 1953–54, 1956–57, 1970–71, 1979–80, 2013–14
 Runners-up: 1907–08, 2002–03
 Third Division/EFL League One:
 Champions: 2008–09
 FA Cup
 Winners: 2021
 Runners-up: 1949, 1961, 1963, 1969
 League Cup
 Winners: 1964, 1997, 2000
 Runners-up: 1965, 1999
 FA Charity Shield/Community Shield
 Winners: 1971, 2021 
 Runners-up: 2016

Appearances

Most appearances
All-time most appearances  (Does not include wartime appearances)
Current players in bold.

Most appearances – 600 by Graham Cross (29 April 1961 – 23 August 1975)
Most league appearances – 528 by Adam Black (24 January 1920 – 9 February 1935)
Most appearances in the first tier (Premier League and predecessors) – 414 by Graham Cross
Most appearances in the second tier (Championship and predecessors) – 304 by Mal Griffiths
Most appearances in the third tier (League One and predecessors) – 46 by Matty Fryatt
Most FA Cup appearances – 59 by Graham Cross (8 January 1963 – 24 February 1975)
Most League Cup appearances – 40 by Graham Cross (26 September 1962 – 8 October 1974) and Steve Walsh (23 September 1986 – 25 January 2000)
Most appearances in a single season – 61 by Gary Mills (46 in FL, 3 PO, 2 FAC, 4 FLC, 6 FMC) (1991–92)

Consecutive appearances
Most consecutive appearances – 331 by Mark Wallington (4 January 1975 – 6 March 1982)
Most consecutive League appearances – 294 by Mark Wallington (11 January 1975 – 2 March 1982)
Most consecutive FA Cup appearances – 52 by Graham Cross – (14 January 1965 – 24 February 1975)
Most consecutive League Cup appearances – 21 by John Sjoberg (15 January 1964 – 4 September 1968) and Mark Wallington (9 September 1975 – 9 October 1984)

Youngest and oldest appearances
Longest Spell at club – 19 years 249 days by Sep Smith (31 August 1929 – 7 May 1949))
Youngest first-team player – 15 years 203 days by Ashley Chambers (v Blackpool, 15 September 2005)
Oldest first-team player – 43 years 21 days by Mark Schwarzer (v Hull City, 27 October 2015)
Oldest debutant – 42 years 111 days by Mark Schwarzer (v Tottenham, 24 January 2015)

Goalscorers

Top goalscorers
Top 10 all-time top goalscorers (Does not include wartime appearances.) Current players in bold.

Most goals – 273 by Arthur Chandler
Most league goals – 259 by Arthur Chandler
Most goals in the first tier (Premier League and predecessors) – 203 by Arthur Chandler
Most goals in the second tier (Championship and predecessors) – 208 by Arthur Rowley
Most goals in the third tier (League One and predecessors) - 27 by Matty Fryatt
Most FA Cup goals – 14 by Arthur Chandler and Arthur Rowley
Most League Cup goals – 8 by Mike Stringfellow
Most UEFA Champions League goals – 4 by Riyad Mahrez
Most UEFA Cup/Europa League goals – 5 by Patson Daka
Most European goals - 6 by Harvey Barnes

Top goalscorers in individual matches and seasons
Most goals scored in a single season – 44 by Arthur Rowley (1956–57)
Most goals scored in a season in the first tier (Premier League and predecessors) – 34 by Arthur Chandler (1927–28 and 1928–29)
Most goals scored in a season in the second tier (Championship and predecessors) – 44 by Arthur Rowley (1956–57)
Most goals scored in a season in the third tier (League One and predecessors) – 27 by Matty Fryatt (2008–09)
Most goals scored in one game – 6 by Johnny Duncan (v Port Vale, 25 December 1924) and Arthur Chandler (v Portsmouth, 20 October 1928)
Most goals scored on debut – 4 by Archie Gardiner (v Portsmouth, 21 February 1934)

Other goalscoring records
Most consecutive games scored in – 8 by Arthur Chandler (6 December 1924 – 10 January 1925) and by Jamie Vardy (19 October 2019 – 8 December 2019)
Most consecutive league games scored in – 11 by Jamie Vardy (29 August 2015 – 28 November 2015)
Most hat-tricks (or better) – 17 by Arthur Chandler (12x3, 1x4, 3x5, 1x6)
Most penalties scored – 41 by Arthur Rowley
Youngest goalscorer – 16 years 192 days by Dave Buchanan (v Oldham Athletic, 1 January 1979)
Oldest goalscorer – 40 years 233 days by Kevin Phillips (v Blackpool, 15 March 2014)
Quickest goal – 9 seconds by Matty Fryatt (v Preston North End, 15 April 2006)
Quickest hat-trick – 5 minutes by Fred Shinton (v Oldham Athletic, 29 November 1909)

Internationals
As of 29 July 2022
Most international caps won while at Leicester – 84 by Kasper Schmeichel for Denmark
Most England international caps won while at Leicester – 37 by Gordon Banks
Most Scotland international caps won while at Leicester – 18 by Matt Elliott
Most Wales international caps won while at Leicester – 50 by Andy King 
Most Northern Ireland international caps won while at Leicester – 39 by John O'Neill
Most international caps won while at Leicester for a non-British nation – 84 by Kasper Schmeichel for Denmark 
Most international goals scored while at Leicester – 8 by Riyad Mahrez for Algeria
Most England international goals scored while at Leicester – 7 by Jamie Vardy

Scorelines

Wins
Biggest win – 13–0 (v Notts Olympic – FA Cup, 13 October 1894)
Biggest league win – 10–0 (v Portsmouth, 20 October 1928)
Biggest win in the first tier (Premier League and predecessors) – 10–0 (v Portsmouth, 20 October 1928)
Biggest Premier League win – 9–0 (v Southampton, 25 October 2019)
Biggest win in the second tier (Championship and predecessors) – 9–1 (v Walsall Town Swifts, 5 January 1895) and (v Gainsborough Trinity, 27 December 1909)
Biggest win in the third tier (League One and predecessors) – 4–0 (on three separate occasions)
Biggest FA Cup win – 13–0 (v Notts Olympic, 13 October 1894)
Biggest League Cup win – 8–1 (v Coventry City, 1 December 1964)

Draws
Highest scoring draw – 6–6 (v Arsenal, 21 April 1930)
Highest scoring draw in the first tier (Premier League and predecessors) – 6–6 (v Arsenal, 21 April 1930)
Highest scoring draw in the second tier (Championship and predecessors) – 5–5 (v Sheffield United, 3 November 1951)
Highest scoring draw in the third tier (League One and predecessors) – 2–2 (on six separate occasions)
Highest scoring FA Cup draw – 5–5 (v Tottenham Hotspur, 10 January 1914) and (v Luton Town, 12 February 1949)
Highest scoring League Cup draw – 4–4 (v Charlton Athletic, 26 September 1962)

Defeats
Biggest defeat – 0–12 (v Nottingham Forest, 21 April 1909)
Biggest league defeat – 0–12 (v Nottingham Forest, 21 April 1909)
Biggest defeat in the first tier (Premier League and predecessors) – 0–12 (v Nottingham Forest, 21 April 1909)
Biggest defeat in the second tier (Championship and predecessors) – 0–9 (v Woolwich Arsenal, 26 October 1903)
Biggest defeat in the third tier (League One and predecessors) – 0–2 (v Tranmere Rovers, 11 March 2009) and (v Peterborough United, 28 March 2009)
Biggest FA Cup defeat – 0–5 (v Manchester City, 17 January 1996)
Biggest League Cup defeat – 1–7 (v Sheffield Wednesday, 27 October 1992) and 0–6 (v Leeds United, 9 October 2001)

Sequences

Consecutive wins
Most consecutive league wins – 9 (21 December 2013 – 1 February 2014) 
Most consecutive league home wins – 13 (3 September 1906 – 29 December 1906)
Most consecutive league away wins – 5 (21 December 2013 – 1 February 2014)
Most consecutive wins in all competitions – 10 (26 December 1962 – 16 March 1963)
Most consecutive FA Cup wins – 6 (9 January 2021 – Present)
Most consecutive League Cup wins – 6 (16 September 1998 – 17 February 1999)

Consecutive draws
Most consecutive league draws – 6 (on three occasions)
Most consecutive league home draws – 5 (on three occasions)
Most consecutive league away draws – 5 (on two occasions)
Most consecutive league 0–0 draws – 3 (on four occasions)

Consecutive defeats
Most consecutive league defeats – 8 (17 March 2001 – 28 April 2001)
Most consecutive league home defeats – 5 (3 January 1959 – 18 March 1959)
Most consecutive league away defeats – 15 (18 October 1986 – 2 May 1987)
Most consecutive defeats in all competitions – 9 (10 March 2001 – 28 April 2001)
Most consecutive FA Cup defeats – 7 (19 February 1985 – 5 January 1991)
Most consecutive League Cup defeats – 9 (11 November 1975 – 6 October 1981)

Consecutive games without defeat
Most consecutive league games without defeat – 23 (1 November 2008 – 7 March 2009)
Most consecutive league home games without defeat – 40 (12 February 1898 – 17 April 1900)
Most consecutive league away games without defeat – 13 (21 December 2013 – 23 August 2014)
Most consecutive games without defeat in all competitions – 17 (6 December 1924 – 28 February 1925)
Most consecutive FA Cup games without defeat – 9 (7 January 1961 – 27 March 1961)
Most consecutive League Cup games without defeat – 17 (25 September 1963 – 10 February 1965)

Consecutive games without a win
Most consecutive league games without a win – 18 (12 April 1975 – 1 November 1975)
Most consecutive league home games without a win – 12 (22 November 2003 – 24 April 2004)
Most consecutive league away games without a win – 23 (19 November 1988 – 4 November 1989)
Most consecutive games without winning in all competitions – 18 (12 April 1975 – 13 September 1976)
Most consecutive FA Cup games without winning – 7 (19 February 1985 – January 1991)
Most consecutive League Cup games without winning – 9 (11 November 1975 – 6 October 1981)

Consecutive scoring and conceding runs
Most consecutive league games scored in – 32 (23 November 2013 – 16 August 2014)
Most consecutive league games without scoring – 7 (21 November 1987 – 1 January 1988)
Most consecutive league games without conceding – 7 (14 February 1920 – 27 March 1920)
Most consecutive league games without a clean sheet – 37 (9 February 1957 – 26 December 1957)

Individual League Seasons

Wins
Most league wins in a season – 31 (from 46 games, Championship, 2013–14)
Most home league wins in a season – 17 (from 23 games, Championship, 2013–14)
Most away league wins in a season – 14 (from 23 games, League One, 2008–09) and (from 23 games, Championship, 2013–14)
Fewest league wins in a season –  5 (from 42 games, First Division (old), 1977–78) and (from 38 games, Premier League, 2001–02)
Fewest home league wins in a season – 3 (from 19 games, Premier League, 2001–02) and (from 19 games, Premier League, 2003–04)
Fewest away league wins in a season – 1 (on 3 occasions)

Draws
Most league draws in a season – 21 (from 46 games, Championship, 2004–05)
Most home league draws in a season – 10 (on 3 occasions)
Most away league draws in a season – 13 (from 23 games, Championship, 2004–05)
Fewest league draws in a season – 4 (on 5 occasions)
Fewest home league draws in a season – 0 (from 15 games, Second Division (old), 1895–96)
Fewest away league draws in a season – 0 (from 19 games, Second Division (old), 1914–15)

Defeats
Most league defeats in a season – 25 (from 42 games, First Division (old), 1977–78) and (from 42 games, Premier League 1994–95)
Most home league defeats in a season – 10 (from 21 games, First Division (old), 1977–78) and (from 21 games, Premier League, 1994–95)
Most away league defeats in a season – 17 (from 21 games, First Division (old), 1957–58) and (from 21 games, First Division (old), 1986–87)
Fewest league defeats in a season – 3 (from 38 games, Premier League, 2015–16)
Fewest home league defeats in a season – 0 (from 21 games, First Division (old), 1928–29) and (from 17 games, Second Division (old), 1898–99)
Fewest away league defeats in a season – 2 (from 19 games, Premier League, 2015–16)

Goals Scored
Most league goals scored in a season – 109 (from 42 games, Second Division (old), 1956–57)
Most home league goals scored in a season – 68 (in 21 games, Second Division (old), 1956–57)
Most away league goals scored in a season – 43 (from 23 games, League One, 2008–09)
Fewest league goals scored in a season – 26 (from 42 games, First Division (old), 1977–78)
Fewest home league goals scored in a season – 15 (from 19 games, Premier League, 2001–02)
Fewest away league goals scored in a season – 9 (from 21 games, Second Division (old), 1921–22)

Goals Conceded
Most league goals conceded in a season – 112 (from 42 games, First Division (old), 1957–58)
Most home league goals conceded in a season – 41 (in 21 games, First Division (old), 1957–58)
Most away league goals conceded in a season – 71 (in 21 games, First Division (old), 1957–58)
Fewest league goals conceded in a season – 30 (from 42 games, Second Division (old), 1970–71)
Fewest home league goals conceded in a season – 8 (from 17 games, Second Division (old), 1899–1900)
Fewest away league goals conceded in a season – 16 (from 21 games, Second Division (old), 1970–71)

Goal Difference
Best league goal difference in a season – +58 (from 42 games, Second Division (old), 1924–25)
Worst league goal difference in a season – -48 (from 38 games, First Division (old), 1908–09)

Points
Most league points in a season (2 points for a win) – 61 (from 42 games, Second Division (old), 1956–57)
Most league points in a season (3 points for a win) – 102 (from 46 games, Championship, 2013–14)
Fewest league points in a season (2 points for a win) – 22 (from 34 games, Second Division (old), 1903–04) and (from 42 games, First Division (old), 1977–78)
Fewest league points in a season (3 points for a win) – 28 (from 38 games), Premier League, 2001–02)

Opponents and Familiarity
All stats correct up to 19 October 2019
Club played most often – 141 times v Arsenal (including as Woolwich Arsenal)
Club played most often in the league – 128 times v West Ham United 
Club played most often in the FA Cup – 15 times v Manchester City
Club played most often in a single season 7 times v Arsenal (2xFL, 3xFAC, 2xFLC)(1974–75)
Non-home ground Leicester have played on most often – 65 times on the Boleyn Ground (a.k.a. Upton Park)(including twice v Charlton Athletic)
Player who has scored the most goals scored against Leicester – 18 by Dixie Dean (18 with Everton) and George Brown (9 with Huddersfield Town and 9 with Aston Villa)

Home attendances
Highest home attendance – 47,298 v Tottenham Hotspur (at Filbert Street, (FA Cup 5th round, 18 February 1928)
Highest home league attendance – 42,486 v Arsenal (at Filbert Street, First Division (old), 2 October 1954)
Highest home attendance in the second tier (Championship and predecessors) – 40,830 v Nottingham Forest (at Filbert Street, 17 November 1956)
Highest home attendance in the third tier (League One and predecessors) – 30,542  v Scunthorpe United (at Walkers Stadium, 24 April 2009)
Highest home FA Cup attendance – 47,298 v Tottenham Hotspur (at Filbert Street, 5th round, 8 February 1928)
Highest home League Cup attendance – 35,121 v West Bromwich Albion (at Filbert Street, 5th round, 29 October 1969)
Highest average attendance for a league season – 32,014 (Premier League, 2015–16)
Highest attendance at Walkers/King Power Stadium – 32,242 v Sunderland (Premier League, 8 August 2015)

References and notes

Leicester City
Records and Statistics
football